Marvel's M.O.D.O.K., or simply M.O.D.O.K., is an American stop-motion adult animated television series created by Jordan Blum and Patton Oswalt for Hulu, based on the Marvel Comics character of the same name. The series is produced by Marvel Television, with Blum and Oswalt serving as showrunners.

Oswalt stars as M.O.D.O.K., a supervillain struggling to handle his company and family. Aimee Garcia, Ben Schwartz, Melissa Fumero, Wendi McLendon-Covey, Beck Bennett, Jon Daly, and Sam Richardson also star. M.O.D.O.K. was officially announced with a series order at Hulu in February 2019, as part of a group of series based on Marvel characters that were intended to lead to a crossover special titled The Offenders, with it being produced by Marvel Television. Oversight of the series was moved to Marvel Studios in December 2019 when Marvel Television was folded into that company. The cast was announced in January 2020, with writing and recording completed later. The stop-motion animation for the series is provided by Stoopid Buddy Stoodios.

M.O.D.O.K.s ten episodes were released on May 21, 2021. Upon its debut, the show was well received by critics, with praise going to the animation, writing, references from other Marvel properties, and the voice acting, particularly Oswalt's. The series was canceled after one season in May 2022.

Premise
After spending years failing to gain control of the world and to defeat the superheroes he challenged along the way, M.O.D.O.K. having been removed from his company A.I.M. after it falls into bankruptcy and is sold to the rival evil corporation GRUMBL (Just Be Evil), begins to deal with his taunting family while facing a mid-life crisis.

Cast and characters

Main
 Patton Oswalt as George Tarleton / M.O.D.O.K.:A floating robotic engineered head who is the former leader of A.I.M. and is obsessed with having control and conquering the world. He dislikes superheroes and his rival supervillains, believing he should be superior to them, before facing a mid-life crisis with his suburban New Jersey family.
 Oswalt also voices Anomaly: The younger college-aged M.O.D.O.K. who becomes displaced in time and threatens to wipe out his future self's family so that their plans for world conquest can be secured.
 Oswalt later appears as himself through a Snapchat filter on M.O.D.O.K. in the season one finale.
 Aimee Garcia as Jodie Ramirez-Tarleton:M.O.D.O.K.'s Judeo-Mexican American wife who questions his role as the superior supervillain. She decides to pursue a new career after running a mom-blog, earning money to support their family before becoming a supervillain herself, gaining attention from a superhero, which was said to go "beyond expectations for typical sitcom wives". In episode 8, she uses the pen name Jodie Ramirez-Modok.
 Ben Schwartz as Louis "Lou" Tarleton:M.O.D.O.K.'s socially awkward 12-year-old son who is different from the rest of his family, and does not have a care in the world. He claims his name stands for Lanky Organism Undeniably Irresistible and Syphilitic; the last word that he chose, he admits that he thought sounded cool. The character wears a blue sweatshirt as a nod to Schwartz voicing characters associated with that color in Rise of the Teenage Mutant Ninja Turtles, DuckTales, and Sonic the Hedgehog.
 Schwartz also voices Lou's robotic duplicate and adoptive twin brother, with the pair being treated as the same person and collectively known as "The Lous."
 Melissa Fumero as Melissa Tarleton:M.O.D.O.K.'s 17-year-old daughter who shares her father's appearance. She is the most popular girl at her high school and wants to gain her father's approval as a supervillain. She is also openly bisexual. She claims her name stands for Mental Entity Living to Induce Seriously Sinister Anarchy, but M.O.D.O.K. named her after Melissa Etheridge.
 Wendi McLendon-Covey as Monica Rappaccini / Scientist Supreme: M.O.D.O.K.'s workplace arch-nemesis whom he is forced to work with.
 Beck Bennett as Austin Van Der Sleet:M.O.D.O.K.'s new boss in his twenties who is from GRUMBL, a large tech company that invests in and takes control of A.I.M., He is also revealed to be in allegiance to Hexus, the Living Corporation.
 Jon Daly as Super-Adaptoid:A robot who has high ambitions as an artist and hates being enslaved as M.O.D.O.K.'s servant. It is revealed in "O, Were Blood Thicker Than Robot Juice!" that he has betrayed the family on multiple occasions, only for them to reset him. Despite this, the family sometimes forgets he exists.
 Sam Richardson as Garfield "Gary" Garoldson:M.O.D.O.K.'s one armed loyal henchman who is constantly optimistic. He has a husband named Big Mike who is a trucker.

Guest
 Jon Hamm as Tony Stark / Iron Man: A superhero and the owner of Stark Industries.
 Nathan Fillion as Simon Williams / Wonder Man: A superhero and the owner of Williams Innovations.
 Whoopi Goldberg as Poundcakes: A wrestler with super-strength.
 Bill Hader as The Leader: A supervillain with a large cranium and genius intellect.
 Hader also voices Angar the Screamer: A former rocker turned supervillain with enhanced vocal chords that produce sonic sound.
 Hader also voices Drake Shannon / Orb: The usually quiet bartender of the Bar with No Name.
 Kevin Michael Richardson as Mister Sinister: A supervillain and an enemy of the X-Men who specializes in mutant genetics.
 Richardson also voices Mandrill: A supervillain who was once a scientist that was mutated into a mandrill hybrid who is dating Armadillo's ex-wife.
 Richardson also voices Whirlwind: A supervillain who wears armor that grants aerokinesis.
 Meredith Salenger as Madame Masque: A supervillainess who wears a golden mask to hide her disfigured face.
 Zara Mizrahi as Carmilla Rappaccini: Monica's biological teenage daughter who does not care much for her mother's work.  
 Dustin Ybarra as Armadillo: A supervillain with enhanced toughened skin and claws that allow him to dig anywhere.
 Chris Parnell as Tenpin: A bowling-themed member of the Death-Throws that is equipped with exploding bowling pins.
 Eddie Pepitone as Bruno Horgan / Melter: A supervillain with enhanced heat powers.
 Jonathan Kite as Tatterdemalion: A homeless supervillain who is antagonized by Wonder Man.
 Alan Tudyk as Arcade: A circus-themed supervillain and the owner of Murderworld who kidnaps M.O.D.O.K's family while working with the Anomaly.

Episodes

Production

Development
In February 2019, Marvel Television announced plans to develop an adult animated television series based on MODOK, with a series order at Hulu, along with ones based on Hit-Monkey, Tigra and Dazzler, and Howard the Duck, that were intended to lead up to a crossover special titled The Offenders. The series was created by Jordan Blum and Patton Oswalt, both of whom were expected to write for the series and executive produce alongside Jeph Loeb. Brett Crawley, Robert Maitia, Grant Gish, Joe Quesada, and Karim Zreik also executive produce. In December, Marvel Television was folded into Marvel Studios, which carried subsequent oversight of the series. The following month, Marvel decided not to move forward with Howard the Duck, Tigra & Dazzler, and The Offenders, with M.O.D.O.K. and Hit Monkey continuing as planned.

Following Marvel Television's absorption into Marvel Studios, Blum stated that Kevin Feige was supportive of the show and told him to "keep going" with the concept. Blum was allowed to give the series its own multiverse designation and chose Earth-1226 in honor of his son's birthday. In April 2021, Blum revealed that a second season was planned. In January 2022, Hulu's head of content Craig Erwich stated that additional seasons of M.O.D.O.K. would be determined solely by the Marvel Studios team. In May 2022, Hulu canceled the series after one season.

Casting
The series' announcement revealed that Oswalt was set to voice M.O.D.O.K. In January 2020, the announcement of Aimee Garcia, Ben Schwartz, Melissa Fumero, Wendi McLendon-Covey, Beck Bennett, Jon Daly, and Sam Richardson as the series' cast was confirmed.

Writing 
By that October, Oswalt confirmed that writing and audio recording for the series had concluded, under the working title Bighead. In January 2020, Craig Erwich, Hulu's Senior Vice President of Originals, revealed that "a few episodes of" the series had completed recording. Oswalt stated that Marvel allowed him and the creative team to include a variety of popular and relatively unknown characters in the series, which include several superheroes and members of X-Men-related teams. Blum said that due to rights issues, the only characters they could not use were Stilt-Man, Paste-Pot Pete and Turner D. Century. Prior to the cancellation of The Offenders, Blum was brought on to overlook the other shows and had even thought up about what the crossover would have entailed. He added that not much had changed storywise when it was decided to make M.O.D.O.K. a standalone series.

Animation
Work on the stop-motion aspects of the series was revealed to have been completed by October 2020 with Stoopid Buddy Stoodios providing the visuals for the episodes, which had "every frame [packed] with crazy detail". During the series' New York Comic Con online panel later that month, Oswalt revealed that Stoopid Buddy Studios created "innovative technology" that used handheld-styled cinematography techniques for the stop-motion puppet designs of the characters and environment.

Music
Daniel Rojas serves as the composer for the series.

Marketing
In September 2020, Hulu revealed the series' logo, and Entertainment Weekly released first look images for the series on October 9, 2020, ahead of a panel that was held during the virtual New York Comic Con later that day, where Blum and Oswalt presented two clips from the series and a behind-the-scenes B-roll.

To promote the series, Patton Oswalt and Jordan Blum co-wrote a miniseries for Marvel Comics titled M.O.D.O.K.: Head Games. The comic quickly establishes the existence of M.O.D.O.K.'s family from the Hulu series into the mainstream Marvel Universe, albeit as a trio of Super-Adaptoids that were copied from his hallucinations brought upon by a glitched program in his head.

Release
M.O.D.O.K. premiered on Hulu on May 21, 2021, releasing all ten episodes simultaneously. On that same day, the first episode released on the Star content hub of Disney+ with a subsequent weekly window.

Reception

Audience viewership 
According to Whip Media's viewership tracking app TV Time, M.O.D.O.K was the 3rd most anticipated new television series, during the month of May 2022.

Critical response 
The review aggregator website Rotten Tomatoes reports an 88% approval rating with an average rating of 7.77/10 based on 34 critic reviews. The website's critical consensus reads: "Though its tendency toward too-muchness may test some viewers' patience, slick stop-motion, a killer voice cast, and a seemingly endless well of jokes make M.O.D.O.K. an entertainingly chaotic diversion." On Metacritic, it has a weighted average score of 71 out of 100 based on 8 critic reviews, indicating "generally favorable reviews".

Glen Weldon of NPR gave the series a positive review, comparing it to Robot Chicken and stating, "Marvel's M.O.D.O.K. was expressly created to cordon off one tiny, weird, backwater corner of the Marvel Universe, and go nuts. Which is exactly what it accomplishes, in a fun, if Robot Chicken-flavored, way." Daniel Fienberg of The Hollywood Reporter gave the series a more critical review, comparing it to both Robot Chicken and Harley Quinn, saying that it "falls short of Harley Quinn territory and lands smack-dab in the middle of Robot Chicken country," and finally stating that "The voices and pell-mell references are the biggest reason why a 10-episode weekend binge of Marvel's MODOK amounted to such easy, quickly digested entertainment. Whether or not you think the series wants to amount to more than that — and I feel like it really does, and perhaps someday could — depends on you."

Eric Francisco of Inverse gave the series a positive review, stating that "In its own tragicomic corner, outside the Marvel Cinematic Universe, M.O.D.O.K. shines as a nuanced portrait of a supervillain trying to have it all" and that "M.O.D.O.K. has strengths all its own, primarily as a too-real tragicomedy about a life gone awry and a marriage crumbling into dust," while adding that "it isn't as funny, vulgar, or insightful as Harley Quinn ... nor is it as boundary-expanding as WandaVision." Siddhant Adlakha of IGN gave the series an 8 out of 10 rating, stating that "Marvel's farcical M.O.D.O.K. series is a refreshing, mile-a-minute comic self-parody. Every line is a laugh, and Patton Oswalt is pitch-perfect as the iconic supervillain, whose Frankenstein origins are traded in for a streamlined saga of ego and ambition, blended with both a modern workplace comedy and a surprisingly moving family sitcom."

Collider included M.O.D.O.K in their "Best Comedy Shows on Hulu" list in September 2022. Entertainment Weekly included M.O.D.O.K in their "The best TV shows on Hulu" list of Summer 2022.

Accolades 
M.O.D.O.K was nominated for Best Animation TrailerByte for a Feature Film at the 2022 Golden Trailer Awards.

References

External links 
 
 
 

2020s American animated comedy television series
2020s American adult animated television series
2020s American comic science fiction television series
2020s American superhero comedy television series
2021 American television series debuts
2021 American television series endings
American adult animated comedy television series
American adult animated science fiction television series
American adult animated superhero television series
American stop-motion adult animated television series
Adult animated television shows based on Marvel Comics
English-language television shows
Hulu original programming
Supervillain television shows
Television series by Marvel Studios
Television series by Marvel Television
Television series by Stoopid Buddy Stoodios